Centrosaurinae (from the Greek, meaning "pointed lizards") is a subfamily of ceratopsid dinosaurs, a group of large quadrupedal ornithischians. Centrosaurine fossil remains are known primarily from the northern region of Laramidia (modern day Alberta, Montana, and Alaska) but isolated taxa have been found in China and Utah as well.

Defining features of centrosaurines include a large nasal horn, short supratemporal horns, and an ornamented frill projecting from the back of the skull. With the exception of Centrosaurus apertus, all adult centrosaurines have spike-like ornaments midway up the skull. Morphometric analysis shows that centrosaurines differ from other ceratopsian groups in skull, snout, and frill shapes. There is evidence to suggest that male centrosaurines had an extended period of adolescence, and sexual ornamentation did not appear until adulthood.

Centrosaurinae was named by paleontologist Lawrence Lambe in 1915, with Centrosaurus as the type genus. The centrosaurines are further divided into three tribes: the Nasutoceratopsini, the Centrosaurini, and the Pachyrhinosaurini by Ryan et al (2016). Nasutoceratopsins are defined as centrosaurines closer to Nasutoceratops titusi than to Centrosaurus apertus and centrosaurins are defined as centrosaurines (more specifically eucentrosaurans) closer to Centrosaurus apertus than to Pachyrhinosaurus canadensis. Until 2016, the only division used was Pachyrhinosaurini, which is defined as centrosaurines closer to Pachyrhinosaurus canadensis than to Centrosaurus apertus.

Classification
The classification of centrosaurines and the relationships among the various species is complicated by a wide degree of variation between individuals and growth stages. Some features that have traditionally been used to classify these dinosaurs, like the number and arrangement of frill ornaments or spikes, have been discovered to be more variable than previously thought. For example, the cladogram presented below follows a 2016 phylogenetic analysis by Chiba et al. (2017). These authors treated the species Rubeosaurus ovatus as distinct from Styracosaurus albertensis, and recovered several distinct clades within Centrosaurini, which together formed a sister group to the Pachyrhinosaurini:

However, subsequent studies have cast doubt on the usefulness of minor variations in frill spike arrangement for classifying centrosaurines. In particular, large sample sizes of the species Centrosaurus apertus and Styracosaurus albertensis have shown a higher than predicted amount of variation. In 2020, Holmes et al. explored what the effect of recognizing such diversity would have on centrosaur classification. They used the same data as Chiba et al.'''s 2017 study, but treated Rubeosaurus as a synonym of Styracosaurus, dropping it from their taxon list. The resulting cladogram (below) found Centrosaurini as a polytomy, a grouping with no discernable sister group relationships within it. The authors concluded that this meant the variation present within these species made it difficult to find any real resolution among them, and may even provide support for the hypothesis that centrosaurines evolved primarily via anagenesis (a single lineage changing through time) rather than cladogenesis (multiple branching lineages with shared common ancestors).

Biogeography

Centrosaurine fossils have mostly been found in Western North America (Alberta, Montana, and Alaska). In the United States, two taxa, Diabloceratops and Machairoceratops, have been found as far south as Utah. Yehuecauhceratops, a nasutoceratopsin from Coahuila, Mexico, is the southernmost occurrence of a centrosaurine in North America.  No centrosaurine fossils had been uncovered outside Western North America until the 2010 discovery of Sinoceratops in the Shandong Province of China. However, some authors question the placement of Sinoceratops within Centrosaurinae. All other Late Cretaceous dinosaur groups from North America have also been found in Asia, so the initial absence of Asian centrosaurines had been surprising. The current evidence suggests that Centrosaurinae originated in Laramidia 90-80 million years ago, with the discovery of the oldest known centrosaurine, Menefeeceratops further proving this. This means Sinoceratops would have migrated to China from North America. Some hypothesize that centrosaurines originated in southern Laramidia and later radiated north.

Body size
Compared to their sister group, Chasmosaurinae, centrosaurines are relatively small. By contrast, the skull length of Albertoceratops'' was more typical for this group at only .

Reproduction
 
Possible neonate sized centrosaurine fossils have been documented in the scientific literature. Research indicates that centrosaurines did not achieve fully developed mating signals until nearly fully grown. Scott D. Sampson found commonality between the slow growth of mating signals in centrosaurines and the extended adolescence of animals whose social structures are ranked hierarchies founded on age-related differences. In these sorts of groups, young males are typically sexually mature for several years before actually beginning to breed, when their mating signals are most fully developed. Females, by contrast, do not have such an extended adolescence.

See also

 Timeline of ceratopsian research

Footnotes

References
 
 Sampson, S. D., 2001, Speculations on the socioecology of Ceratopsid dinosaurs  (Orinthischia: Neoceratopsia): In: Mesozoic Vertebrate Life, edited by Tanke,  D. H., and Carpenter, K., Indiana University Press, pp. 263–276.
 Tanke, D.H. and Brett-Surman, M.K. 2001. Evidence of Hatchling and Nestling-Size Hadrosaurs (Reptilia:Ornithischia) from Dinosaur Provincial Park (Dinosaur Park Formation: Campanian), Alberta, Canada. pp. 206–218. In: Mesozoic Vertebrate Life—New Research Inspired by the Paleontology of Philip J. Currie. Edited by D.H. Tanke and K. Carpenter. Indiana University Press: Bloomington. xviii + 577 pp.

Ceratopsids